Thomas Josiah Thompson (1867-1941), was a Sierra Leonean lawyer and politician who served as Mayor of the Freetown City Council and was the founder and owner of the Sierra Leone Daily Mail, which operated from 1933 to 1994.

References
Thomas Josiah Thompson, The Jubilee and Centenary Volume of Fourah Bay College, Freetown, Sierra Leone
Marika Sherwood, Origins of Pan-Africanism: Henry Sylvester Williams, Africa, and the African Diaspora, (Routledge, (2012)

20th-century Sierra Leonean politicians
Sierra Leonean city councillors
Mayors of Freetown
Sierra Leone Creole people
Fourah Bay College alumni
1867 births
1941 deaths
20th-century Sierra Leonean lawyers